Judaism ( Yahăḏūṯ) is an Abrahamic, monotheistic, and ethnic religion comprising the collective religious, cultural, and legal tradition and civilization of the Jewish people. It has its roots as an organized religion in the Middle East during the Bronze Age. Modern Judaism evolved from Yahwism, the religion of ancient Israel and Judah, by the late 6th century BCE, and is thus considered to be one of the oldest monotheistic religions. Judaism is considered by religious Jews to be the expression of the covenant that God established with the Israelites, their ancestors. It encompasses a wide body of texts, practices, theological positions, and forms of organization.

The Torah, as it is commonly understood by Jews, is part of the larger text known as the Tanakh. The Tanakh is also known to secular scholars of religion as the Hebrew Bible, and to Christians as the "Old Testament". The Torah's supplemental oral tradition is represented by later texts such as the Midrash and the Talmud. The Hebrew word torah can mean "teaching", "law", or "instruction", although "Torah" can also be used as a general term that refers to any Jewish text that expands or elaborates on the original Five Books of Moses. Representing the core of the Jewish spiritual and religious tradition, the Torah is a term and a set of teachings that are explicitly self-positioned as encompassing at least seventy, and potentially infinite, facets and interpretations. Judaism's texts, traditions, and values strongly influenced later Abrahamic religions, including Christianity and Islam. Hebraism, like Hellenism, played a seminal role in the formation of Western civilization through its impact as a core background element of Early Christianity.

Within Judaism, there are a variety of religious movements, most of which emerged from Rabbinic Judaism, which holds that God revealed his laws and commandments to Moses on Mount Sinai in the form of both the Written and Oral Torah. Historically, all or part of this assertion was challenged by various groups such as the Sadducees and Hellenistic Judaism during the Second Temple period; the Karaites during the early and later medieval period; and among segments of the modern non-Orthodox denominations. Some modern branches of Judaism such as Humanistic Judaism may be considered secular or nontheistic. Today, the largest Jewish religious movements are Orthodox Judaism (Haredi Judaism and Modern Orthodox Judaism), Conservative Judaism, and Reform Judaism. Major sources of difference between these groups are their approaches to halakha (Jewish law), the authority of the rabbinic tradition, and the significance of the State of Israel. Orthodox Judaism maintains that the Torah and halakha are divine in origin, eternal and unalterable, and that they should be strictly followed. Conservative and Reform Judaism are more liberal, with Conservative Judaism generally promoting a more traditionalist interpretation of Judaism's requirements than Reform Judaism. A typical Reform position is that halakha should be viewed as a set of general guidelines rather than as a set of restrictions and obligations whose observance is required of all Jews. Historically, special courts enforced halakha; today, these courts still exist but the practice of Judaism is mostly voluntary. Authority on theological and legal matters is not vested in any one person or organization, but in the sacred texts and the rabbis and scholars who interpret them.

Jews are an ethnoreligious group including those born Jewish (or "ethnic Jews"), in addition to converts to Judaism. In 2019, the world Jewish population was estimated at 14.7 million, or roughly 0.19% of the total world population. In 2021, about 45.59% of all Jews resided in Israel and another 42.06% resided in the United States and Canada, with most of the remainder living in Europe, and other minority groups spread throughout Latin America, Asia, Africa, and Australia.

Etymology

The term Judaism derives from Iudaismus, a Latinized form of the Ancient Greek Ioudaismos (Ἰουδαϊσμός) (from the verb , "to side with or imitate the [Judeans]"). Its ultimate source was the Hebrew יהודה, Yehudah, "Judah", which is also the source of the Hebrew term for Judaism: יַהֲדוּת, Yahadut. The term Ἰουδαϊσμός first appears in the Hellenistic Greek book of 2 Maccabees in the 2nd century BCE. In the context of the age and period it meant "seeking or forming part of a cultural entity" and it resembled its antonym hellenismos, a word that signified a people's submission to Hellenic (Greek) cultural norms. The conflict between iudaismos and hellenismos lay behind the Maccabean revolt and hence the invention of the term iudaismos.

Shaye J. D. Cohen writes in his book The Beginnings of Jewishness:

According to the Oxford English Dictionary the earliest citation in English where the term was used to mean "the profession or practice of the Jewish religion; the religious system or polity of the Jews" is Robert Fabyan's The newe cronycles of Englande and of Fraunce (1516). "Judaism" as a direct translation of the Latin Iudaismus first occurred in a 1611 English translation of the apocrypha (Deuterocanon in Catholic and Eastern Orthodoxy), 2 Macc. ii. 21: "Those that behaved themselves manfully to their honour for Iudaisme."

History

Origins

At its core, the Hebrew Bible (Tanakh) is an account of the Israelites' relationship with God from their earliest history until the building of the Second Temple (c. 535 BCE). Abraham is hailed as the first Hebrew and the father of the Jewish people. As a reward for his act of faith in one God, he was promised that Isaac, his second son, would inherit the Land of Israel (then called Canaan). Later, the descendants of Isaac's son Jacob were enslaved in Egypt, and God commanded Moses to lead the Exodus from Egypt. At Mount Sinai, they received the Torah—the five books of Moses. These books, together with Nevi'im and Ketuvim are known as Torah Shebikhtav as opposed to the Oral Torah, which refers to the Mishnah and the Talmud. Eventually, God led them to the land of Israel where the tabernacle was planted in the city of Shiloh for over 300 years to rally the nation against attacking enemies. As time went on, the spiritual level of the nation declined to the point that God allowed the Philistines to capture the tabernacle. The people of Israel then told Samuel the prophet that they needed to be governed by a permanent king, and Samuel appointed Saul to be their King. When the people pressured Saul into going against a command conveyed to him by Samuel, God told Samuel to appoint David in his stead.

Once King David was established, he told the prophet Nathan that he would like to build a permanent temple, and as a reward for his actions, God promised David that he would allow his son, Solomon, to build the First Temple and the throne would never depart from his children.

Rabbinic tradition holds that the details and interpretation of the law, which are called the Oral Torah or oral law, were originally an unwritten tradition based upon what God told Moses on Mount Sinai. However, as the persecutions of the Jews increased and the details were in danger of being forgotten, these oral laws were recorded by Rabbi Judah HaNasi (Judah the Prince) in the Mishnah, redacted circa 200 CE. The Talmud was a compilation of both the Mishnah and the Gemara, rabbinic commentaries redacted over the next three centuries. The Gemara originated in two major centers of Jewish scholarship, Palestine and Babylonia. Correspondingly, two bodies of analysis developed, and two works of Talmud were created. The older compilation is called the Jerusalem Talmud. It was compiled sometime during the 4th century in Palestine. The Babylonian Talmud was compiled from discussions in the houses of study by the scholars Ravina I, Ravina II, and Rav Ashi by 500 CE, although it continued to be edited later.

According to critical scholars, the Torah consists of inconsistent texts edited together in a way that calls attention to divergent accounts. Several of these scholars, such as Professor Martin Rose and John Bright, suggest that during the First Temple period the people of Israel believed that each nation had its own god, but that their god was superior to other gods. Some suggest that strict monotheism developed during the Babylonian Exile, perhaps in reaction to Zoroastrian dualism. In this view, it was only by the Hellenic period that most Jews came to believe that their god was the only god and that the notion of a clearly bounded Jewish nation identical with the Jewish religion formed. John Day argues that the origins of biblical Yahweh, El, Asherah, and Ba'al, may be rooted in earlier Canaanite religion, which was centered on a pantheon of gods much like the Greek pantheon.

Antiquity

According to the Hebrew Bible, a United Monarchy was established under Saul and continued under King David and Solomon with its capital in Jerusalem. After Solomon's reign, the nation split into two kingdoms, the Kingdom of Israel (in the north) and the Kingdom of Judah (in the south). The Kingdom of Israel was destroyed around 720 BCE, when it was conquered by the Neo-Assyrian Empire; many people were taken captive from the capital Samaria to Media and the Khabur River valley. The Kingdom of Judah continued as an independent state until it was conquered by Nebuchadnezzar II of the Neo-Babylonian Empire in 586 BCE. The Babylonians destroyed Jerusalem and the First Temple, which was at the center of ancient Jewish worship. The Judeans were exiled to Babylon, in what is regarded as the first Jewish diaspora. Later, many of them returned to their homeland after the subsequent conquest of Babylon by the Persian Achaemenid Empire seventy years later, an event known as the Return to Zion. A Second Temple was constructed and old religious practices were resumed.

During the early years of the Second Temple, the highest religious authority was a council known as the Great Assembly, led by Ezra the Scribe. Among other accomplishments of the Great Assembly, the last books of the Bible were written at this time and the canon sealed. Hellenistic Judaism spread to Ptolemaic Egypt from the 3rd century BCE.

During the Great Jewish Revolt (66–73 CE), the Romans sacked Jerusalem and destroyed the Second Temple. Later, Roman emperor Hadrian built a pagan idol on the Temple Mount and prohibited circumcision; these acts of ethnocide provoked the Bar Kokhba Revolt (132–136 CE), after which the Romans banned the study of the Torah and the celebration of Jewish holidays, and forcibly removed virtually all Jews from Judea. In 200 CE, however, Jews were granted Roman citizenship and Judaism was recognized as a religio licita ("legitimate religion") until the rise of Gnosticism and Early Christianity in the fourth century.

Following the destruction of Jerusalem and the expulsion of the Jews, Jewish worship stopped being centrally organized around the Temple, prayer took the place of sacrifice, and worship was rebuilt around the community (represented by a minimum of ten adult men) and the establishment of the authority of rabbis who acted as teachers and leaders of individual communities.

Defining characteristics and principles of faith

Unlike other ancient Near Eastern gods, the Hebrew God is portrayed as unitary and solitary; consequently, the Hebrew God's principal relationships are not with other gods, but with the world, and more specifically, with the people he created. Judaism thus begins with ethical monotheism: the belief that God is one and is concerned with the actions of mankind. According to the Hebrew Bible, God promised Abraham to make of his offspring a great nation. Many generations later, he commanded the nation of Israel to love and worship only one God; that is, the Jewish nation is to reciprocate God's concern for the world. He also commanded the Jewish people to love one another; that is, Jews are to imitate God's love for people. These commandments are but two of a large corpus of commandments and laws that constitute this covenant, which is the substance of Judaism.

Thus, although there is an esoteric tradition in Judaism (Kabbalah), Rabbinic scholar Max Kadushin has characterized normative Judaism as "normal mysticism", because it involves everyday personal experiences of God through ways or modes that are common to all Jews. This is played out through the observance of the halakha (Jewish law) and given verbal expression in the Birkat Ha-Mizvot, the short blessings that are spoken every time a positive commandment is to be fulfilled.

Whereas Jewish philosophers often debate whether God is immanent or transcendent, and whether people have free will or their lives are determined, halakha is a system through which any Jew acts to bring God into the world.

Ethical monotheism is central in all sacred or normative texts of Judaism. However, monotheism has not always been followed in practice. The Hebrew Bible (or Tanakh) records and repeatedly condemns the widespread worship of other gods in ancient Israel. In the Greco-Roman era, many different interpretations of monotheism existed in Judaism, including the interpretations that gave rise to Christianity.

Moreover, some have argued that Judaism is a non-creedal religion that does not require one to believe in God. For some, observance of halakha is more important than belief in God per se. In modern times, some liberal Jewish movements do not accept the existence of a personified deity active in history. The debate about whether one can speak of authentic or normative Judaism is not only a debate among religious Jews but also among historians.

Core tenets

In the strict sense, in Judaism, unlike Christianity and Islam, there are no fixed universally binding articles of faith, due to their incorporation into the liturgy. Scholars throughout Jewish history have proposed numerous formulations of Judaism's core tenets, all of which have met with criticism. The most popular formulation is Maimonides' thirteen principles of faith, developed in the 12th century. According to Maimonides, any Jew who rejects even one of these principles would be considered an apostate and a heretic. Jewish scholars have held points of view diverging in various ways from Maimonides' principles. Thus, within Reform Judaism only the first five principles are endorsed.

In Maimonides' time, his list of tenets was criticized by Hasdai Crescas and Joseph Albo. Albo and the Raavad argued that Maimonides' principles contained too many items that, while true, were not fundamentals of the faith

Along these lines, the ancient historian Josephus emphasized practices and observances rather than religious beliefs, associating apostasy with a failure to observe halakha and maintaining that the requirements for conversion to Judaism included circumcision and adherence to traditional customs. Maimonides' principles were largely ignored over the next few centuries. Later, two poetic restatements of these principles ("Ani Ma'amin" and "Yigdal") became integrated into many Jewish liturgies, leading to their eventual near-universal acceptance.

In modern times, Judaism lacks a centralized authority that would dictate an exact religious dogma. Because of this, many different variations on the basic beliefs are considered within the scope of Judaism. Even so, all Jewish religious movements are, to a greater or lesser extent, based on the principles of the Hebrew Bible or various commentaries such as the Talmud and Midrash. Judaism also universally recognizes the Biblical Covenant between God and the Patriarch Abraham as well as the additional aspects of the Covenant revealed to Moses, who is considered Judaism's greatest prophet. In the Mishnah, a core text of Rabbinic Judaism, acceptance of the Divine origins of this covenant is considered an essential aspect of Judaism and those who reject the Covenant forfeit their share in the World to Come.

Establishing the core tenets of Judaism in the modern era is even more difficult, given the number and diversity of the contemporary Jewish denominations. Even if to restrict the problem to the most influential intellectual trends of the nineteenth and twentieth century, the matter remains complicated. Thus for instance, Joseph Soloveitchik's (associated with the Modern Orthodox movement) answer to modernity is constituted upon the identification of Judaism with following the halakha whereas its ultimate goal is to bring the holiness down to the world. Mordecai Kaplan, the founder of the Reconstructionist Judaism, abandons the idea of religion for the sake of identifying Judaism with civilization and by means of the latter term and secular translation of the core ideas, he tries to embrace as many Jewish denominations as possible. In turn, Solomon Schechter's Conservative Judaism was identical with the tradition understood as the interpretation of Torah, in itself being the history of the constant updates and adjustment of the Law performed by means of the creative interpretation. Finally, David Philipson draws the outlines of the Reform movement in Judaism by opposing it to the strict and traditional rabbinical approach and thus comes to the conclusions similar to that of the Conservative movement.

Religious texts

The following is a basic, structured list of the central works of Jewish practice and thought.
 Tanakh (Hebrew Bible) and Rabbinic literature
 Mesorah
 Targum
 Jewish Biblical exegesis (also see Midrash below)
 Works of the Talmudic Era (classic rabbinic literature)
 Mishnah and commentaries
 Tosefta and the minor tractates
 Talmud:
 The Babylonian Talmud and commentaries
 Jerusalem Talmud and commentaries
 Midrashic literature:
 Halakhic Midrash
 Aggadic Midrash
 Halakhic literature
 Major codes of Jewish law and custom
 Mishneh Torah and commentaries
 Tur and commentaries
 Shulchan Aruch and commentaries
 Responsa literature
 Thought and ethics
 Jewish philosophy
 Musar literature and other works of Jewish ethics
 Kabbalah
 Hasidic works
 Siddur and Jewish liturgy
 Piyyut (Classical Jewish poetry)

Legal literature

The basis of halakha and tradition is the Torah (also known as the Pentateuch or the Five Books of Moses). According to rabbinic tradition, there are 613 commandments in the Torah. Some of these laws are directed only to men or to women, some only to the ancient priestly groups, the Kohanim and Leviyim (members of the tribe of Levi), some only to farmers within the Land of Israel. Many laws were only applicable when the Temple in Jerusalem existed, and only 369 of these commandments are still applicable today.

While there have been Jewish groups whose beliefs were based on the written text of the Torah alone (e.g., the Sadducees, and the Karaites), most Jews believe in the oral law. These oral traditions were transmitted by the Pharisee school of thought of ancient Judaism and were later recorded in written form and expanded upon by the rabbis.

According to Rabbinical Jewish tradition, God gave both the Written Law (the Torah) and the Oral Torah to Moses on Mount Sinai. The Oral law is the oral tradition as relayed by God to Moses and from him, transmitted and taught to the sages (rabbinic leaders) of each subsequent generation.

For centuries, the Torah appeared only as a written text transmitted in parallel with the oral tradition. Fearing that the oral teachings might be forgotten, Rabbi Judah haNasi undertook the mission of consolidating the various opinions into one body of law which became known as the Mishnah.

The Mishnah consists of 63 tractates codifying halakha, which are the basis of the Talmud. According to Abraham ben David, the Mishnah was compiled by Rabbi Judah haNasi after the destruction of Jerusalem, in anno mundi 3949, which corresponds to 189 CE.

Over the next four centuries, the Mishnah underwent discussion and debate in both of the world's major Jewish communities (in Israel and Babylonia). The commentaries from each of these communities were eventually compiled into the two Talmuds, the Jerusalem Talmud (Talmud Yerushalmi) and the Babylonian Talmud (Talmud Bavli). These have been further expounded by commentaries of various Torah scholars during the ages.

In the text of the Torah, many words are left undefined and many procedures are mentioned without explanation or instructions. Such phenomena are sometimes offered to validate the viewpoint that the Written Law has always been transmitted with a parallel oral tradition, illustrating the assumption that the reader is already familiar with the details from other, i.e., oral, sources.

Halakha, the rabbinic Jewish way of life, then, is based on a combined reading of the Torah, and the oral tradition—the Mishnah, the halakhic Midrash, the Talmud and its commentaries. The halakha has developed slowly, through a precedent-based system. The literature of questions to rabbis, and their considered answers, is referred to as responsa (in Hebrew, Sheelot U-Teshuvot.) Over time, as practices develop, codes of halakha are written that are based on the responsa; the most important code, the Shulchan Aruch, largely determines Orthodox religious practice today.

Jewish philosophy

Jewish philosophy refers to the conjunction between serious study of philosophy and Jewish theology. Major Jewish philosophers include Philo of Alexandria, Solomon ibn Gabirol, Saadia Gaon, Judah Halevi, Maimonides, and Gersonides. Major changes occurred in response to the Enlightenment (late 18th to early 19th century) leading to the post-Enlightenment Jewish philosophers. Modern Jewish philosophy consists of both Orthodox and non-Orthodox oriented philosophy. Notable among Orthodox Jewish philosophers are Eliyahu Eliezer Dessler, Joseph B. Soloveitchik, and Yitzchok Hutner. Well-known non-Orthodox Jewish philosophers include Martin Buber, Franz Rosenzweig, Mordecai Kaplan, Abraham Joshua Heschel, Will Herberg, and Emmanuel Lévinas.

Rabbinic hermeneutics

Orthodox and many other Jews do not believe that the revealed Torah consists solely of its written contents, but of its interpretations as well. The study of Torah (in its widest sense, to include both poetry, narrative, and law, and both the Hebrew Bible and the Talmud) is in Judaism itself a sacred act of central importance. For the sages of the Mishnah and Talmud, and for their successors today, the study of Torah was therefore not merely a means to learn the contents of God's revelation, but an end in itself. According to the Talmud,

In Judaism, "the study of Torah can be a means of experiencing God". Reflecting on the contribution of the Amoraim and Tanaim to contemporary Judaism, Professor Jacob Neusner observed:

To study the Written Torah and the Oral Torah in light of each other is thus also to study how to study the word of God.

In the study of Torah, the sages formulated and followed various logical and hermeneutical principles. According to David Stern, all Rabbinic hermeneutics rest on two basic axioms:

These two principles make possible a great variety of interpretations. According to the Talmud,

Observant Jews thus view the Torah as dynamic, because it contains within it a host of interpretations.

According to Rabbinic tradition, all valid interpretations of the written Torah were revealed to Moses at Sinai in oral form, and handed down from teacher to pupil (The oral revelation is in effect coextensive with the Talmud itself). When different rabbis forwarded conflicting interpretations, they sometimes appealed to hermeneutic principles to legitimize their arguments; some rabbis claim that these principles were themselves revealed by God to Moses at Sinai.

Thus, Hillel called attention to seven commonly used hermeneutical principles in the interpretation of laws (baraita at the beginning of Sifra); R. Ishmael, thirteen (baraita at the beginning of Sifra; this collection is largely an amplification of that of Hillel). Eliezer b. Jose ha-Gelili listed 32, largely used for the exegesis of narrative elements of Torah. All the hermeneutic rules scattered through the Talmudim and Midrashim have been collected by Malbim in Ayyelet ha-Shachar, the introduction to his commentary on the Sifra. Nevertheless, R. Ishmael's 13 principles are perhaps the ones most widely known; they constitute an important, and one of Judaism's earliest, contributions to logic, hermeneutics, and jurisprudence. Judah Hadassi incorporated Ishmael's principles into Karaite Judaism in the 12th century. Today R. Ishmael's 13 principles are incorporated into the Jewish prayer book to be read by observant Jews on a daily basis.

Jewish identity

Distinction between Jews as a people and Judaism
According to Daniel Boyarin, the underlying distinction between religion and ethnicity is foreign to Judaism itself, and is one form of the dualism between spirit and flesh that has its origin in Platonic philosophy and that permeated Hellenistic Judaism. Consequently, in his view, Judaism does not fit easily into conventional Western categories, such as religion, ethnicity, or culture. Boyarin suggests that this in part reflects the fact that much of Judaism's more than 3,000-year history predates the rise of Western culture and occurred outside the West (that is, Europe, particularly medieval and modern Europe). During this time, Jews experienced slavery, anarchic and theocratic self-government, conquest, occupation, and exile. In the Jewish diaspora, they were in contact with, and influenced by, ancient Egyptian, Babylonian, Persian, and Hellenic cultures, as well as modern movements such as the Enlightenment (see Haskalah) and the rise of nationalism, which would bear fruit in the form of a Jewish state in their ancient homeland, the Land of Israel. They also saw an elite population convert to Judaism (the Khazars), only to disappear as the centers of power in the lands once occupied by that elite fell to the people of Rus and then the Mongols. Thus, Boyarin has argued that "Jewishness disrupts the very categories of identity, because it is not national, not genealogical, not religious, but all of these, in dialectical tension."

In contrast to this point of view, practices such as Humanistic Judaism reject the religious aspects of Judaism, while retaining certain cultural traditions.

Who is a Jew?

According to Rabbinic Judaism, a Jew is anyone who was either born of a Jewish mother or who converted to Judaism in accordance with halakha. Reconstructionist Judaism and the larger denominations of worldwide Progressive Judaism (also known as Liberal or Reform Judaism) accept the child as Jewish if one of the parents is Jewish, if the parents raise the child with a Jewish identity, but not the smaller regional branches. All mainstream forms of Judaism today are open to sincere converts, although conversion has traditionally been discouraged since the time of the Talmud. The conversion process is evaluated by an authority, and the convert is examined on his or her sincerity and knowledge. Converts are called "ben Abraham" or "bat Abraham", (son or daughter of Abraham). Conversions have on occasion been overturned. In 2008, Israel's highest religious court invalidated the conversion of 40,000 Jews, mostly from Russian immigrant families, even though they had been approved by an Orthodox rabbi.

Rabbinical Judaism maintains that a Jew, whether by birth or conversion, is a Jew forever. Thus a Jew who claims to be an atheist or converts to another religion is still considered by traditional Judaism to be Jewish. According to some sources, the Reform movement has maintained that a Jew who has converted to another religion is no longer a Jew, and the Israeli Government has also taken that stance after Supreme Court cases and statutes. However, the Reform movement has indicated that this is not so cut and dried, and different situations call for consideration and differing actions. For example, Jews who have converted under duress may be permitted to return to Judaism "without any action on their part but their desire to rejoin the Jewish community" and "A proselyte who has become an apostate remains, nevertheless, a Jew".

Karaite Judaism believes that Jewish identity can only be transmitted by patrilineal descent. Although a minority of modern Karaites believe that Jewish identity requires that both parents be Jewish, and not only the father. They argue that only patrilineal descent can transmit Jewish identity on the grounds that all descent in the Torah went according to the male line.

The question of what determines Jewish identity in the State of Israel was given new impetus when, in the 1950s, David Ben-Gurion requested opinions on mihu Yehudi ("Who is a Jew") from Jewish religious authorities and intellectuals worldwide in order to settle citizenship questions. This is still not settled, and occasionally resurfaces in Israeli politics.

Historical definitions of Jewish identity have traditionally been based on halakhic definitions of matrilineal descent, and halakhic conversions. Historical definitions of who is a Jew date back to the codification of the Oral Torah into the Babylonian Talmud, around 200 CE. Interpretations of sections of the Tanakh, such as Deuteronomy 7:1–5, by Jewish sages, are used as a warning against intermarriage between Jews and Canaanites because "[the non-Jewish husband] will cause your child to turn away from Me and they will worship the gods (i.e., idols) of others." Leviticus 24 says that the son in a marriage between a Hebrew woman and an Egyptian man is "of the community of Israel." This is complemented by Ezra 10, where Israelites returning from Babylon vow to put aside their gentile wives and their children. A popular theory is that the rape of Jewish women in captivity brought about the law of Jewish identity being inherited through the maternal line, although scholars challenge this theory citing the Talmudic establishment of the law from the pre-exile period. Since the anti-religious Haskalah movement of the late 18th and 19th centuries, halakhic interpretations of Jewish identity have been challenged.

Jewish demographics

The total number of Jews worldwide is difficult to assess because the definition of "who is a Jew" is problematic; not all Jews identify themselves as Jewish, and some who identify as Jewish are not considered so by other Jews. According to the Jewish Year Book (1901), the global Jewish population in 1900 was around 11 million. The latest available data is from the World Jewish Population Survey of 2002 and the Jewish Year Calendar (2005). In 2002, according to the Jewish Population Survey, there were 13.3 million Jews around the world. The Jewish Year Calendar cites 14.6 million. It is 0.25% of world population. Jewish population growth is currently near zero percent, with 0.3% growth from 2000 to 2001.

Jewish religious movements

Rabbinic Judaism
Rabbinic Judaism (or in some Christian traditions, Rabbinism) (Hebrew: "Yahadut Rabanit" – יהדות רבנית) has been the mainstream form of Judaism since the 6th century CE, after the codification of the Talmud. It is characterised by the belief that the Written Torah (Written Law) cannot be correctly interpreted without reference to the Oral Torah and the voluminous literature specifying what behavior is sanctioned by the Law.

The Jewish Enlightenment of the late 18th century resulted in the division of Ashkenazi (Western) Jewry into religious movements or denominations, especially in North America and Anglophone countries. The main denominations today outside Israel (where the situation is rather different) are Orthodox, Conservative, and Reform. The notion "traditional Judaism" includes the Orthodox with Conservative or solely the Orthodox Jews.
Orthodox Judaism holds that both the Written and Oral Torah were divinely revealed to Moses and that the laws within it are binding and unchanging. Orthodox Jews generally consider commentaries on the Shulchan Aruch (a condensed codification of halakha that largely favored Sephardic traditions) to be the definitive codification of halakha. Orthodoxy places a high importance on Maimonides' 13 principles as a definition of Jewish faith.

Orthodoxy is often divided into Haredi Judaism and Modern Orthodox Judaism. Haredi is less accommodating to modernity and has less interest in non-Jewish disciplines, and it may be distinguished from Modern Orthodox Judaism in practice by its styles of dress and more stringent practices. Subsets of Haredi Judaism include Hasidic Judaism, which is rooted in the Kabbalah and distinguished by reliance on a Rebbe or religious teacher; their opponents Misnagdim (Lithuanian); and Sephardic Haredi Judaism, which emerged among Sephardic and Mizrahi (Asian and North African) Jews in Israel. "Centrist" Orthodoxy (Joseph B. Soloveitchik) is sometimes also distinguished.

 Conservative Judaism is characterized by a commitment to traditional halakha and customs, including observance of Shabbat and kashrut, a deliberately non-fundamentalist teaching of Jewish principles of faith, a positive attitude toward modern culture, and an acceptance of both traditional rabbinic and modern scholarship when considering Jewish religious texts. Conservative Judaism teaches that halakha is not static, but has always developed in response to changing conditions. It holds that the Torah is a divine document written by prophets inspired by God and reflecting his will, but rejects the Orthodox position that it was dictated by God to Moses. Conservative Judaism holds that the Oral Law is divine and normative, but holds that both the Written and Oral Law may be interpreted by the rabbis to reflect modern sensibilities and suit modern conditions.
Reform Judaism, called Liberal or Progressive Judaism in many countries, defines Judaism in relatively universalist terms, rejects most of the ritual and ceremonial laws of the Torah while observing moral laws, and emphasizes the ethical call of the Prophets. Reform Judaism has developed an egalitarian prayer service in the vernacular (along with Hebrew in many cases) and emphasizes personal connection to Jewish tradition.
 Reconstructionist Judaism, like Reform Judaism, does not hold that halakha, as such, requires observance, but unlike Reform, Reconstructionist thought emphasizes the role of the community in deciding what observances to follow.
 Jewish Renewal is a recent North American movement which focuses on spirituality and social justice but does not address issues of halakha. Men and women participate equally in prayer.
 Humanistic Judaism is a small non-theistic movement centered in North America and Israel that emphasizes Jewish culture and history as the sources of Jewish identity.
 Subbotniks (Sabbatarians) are a movement of Jews of Russian ethnic origin in the 18th–20th centuries, the majority of whom belonged to Rabbinic and Karaite Judaism. Many settled in the Holy Land as part of the Zionist First Aliyah in order to escape oppression in the Russian Empire and later mostly intermarried with other Jews, their descendants included Alexander Zaïd, Major-General Alik Ron, and the mother of Ariel Sharon.

Sephardi and Mizrahi Judaism

While traditions and customs vary between discrete communities, it can be said that Sephardi and Mizrahi Jewish communities do not generally adhere to the "movement" framework popular in and among Ashkenazi Jewry. Historically, Sephardi and Mizrahi communities have eschewed denominations in favour of a "big tent" approach. This is particularly the case in contemporary Israel, which is home to the largest communities of Sephardi and Mizrahi Jews in the world. (However, individual Sephardi and Mizrahi Jews may be members of or attend synagogues that do adhere to one Ashkenazi-inflected movement or another.)

Sephardi and Mizrahi observance of Judaism tends toward the conservative, and prayer rites are reflective of this, with the text of each rite being largely unchanged since their respective inception. Observant Sephardim may follow the teachings of a particular rabbi or school of thought; for example, the Sephardic Chief Rabbi of Israel.

Jewish movements in Israel

Most Jewish Israelis classify themselves as "secular" (hiloni), "traditional" (masorti), "religious" (dati) or Haredi. The term "secular" is more popular as a self-description among Israeli families of western (European) origin, whose Jewish identity may be a very powerful force in their lives, but who see it as largely independent of traditional religious belief and practice. This portion of the population largely ignores organized religious life, be it of the official Israeli rabbinate (Orthodox) or of the liberal movements common to diaspora Judaism (Reform, Conservative).

The term "traditional" (masorti) is most common as a self-description among Israeli families of "eastern" origin (i.e., the Middle East, Central Asia, and North Africa). This term, as commonly used, has nothing to do with the Conservative Judaism, which also names itself "Masorti" outside North America. There is a great deal of ambiguity in the ways "secular" and "traditional" are used in Israel: they often overlap, and they cover an extremely wide range in terms of worldview and practical religious observance. The term "Orthodox" is not popular in Israeli discourse, although the percentage of Jews who come under that category is far greater than in the Jewish diaspora. What would be called "Orthodox" in the diaspora includes what is commonly called dati (religious) or haredi (ultra-Orthodox) in Israel. The former term includes what is called "Religious Zionism" or the "National Religious" community, as well as what has become known over the past decade or so as haredi-leumi (nationalist haredi), or "Hardal", which combines a largely haredi lifestyle with nationalist ideology. (Some people, in Yiddish, also refer to observant Orthodox Jews as frum, as opposed to frei (more liberal Jews)).

Haredi applies to a populace that can be roughly divided into three separate groups along both ethnic and ideological lines: (1) "Lithuanian" (non-hasidic) haredim of Ashkenazic origin; (2) Hasidic haredim of Ashkenazic origin; and (3) Sephardic haredim.

Karaites and Samaritans
Karaite Judaism defines itself as the remnants of the non-Rabbinic Jewish sects of the Second Temple period, such as the Sadducees. The Karaites ("Scripturalists") accept only the Hebrew Bible and what they view as the Peshat ("simple" meaning); they do not accept non-biblical writings as authoritative. Some European Karaites do not see themselves as part of the Jewish community at all, although most do.

The Samaritans, a very small community located entirely around Mount Gerizim in the Nablus/Shechem region of the West Bank and in Holon, near Tel Aviv in Israel, regard themselves as the descendants of the Israelites of the Iron Age kingdom of Israel. Their religious practices are based on the literal text of the written Torah (Five Books of Moses), which they view as the only authoritative scripture (with a special regard also for the Samaritan Book of Joshua).

Haymanot (Ethiopian Judaism)

Haymanot (meaning "religion" in Ge'ez and Amharic) refers the Judaism practiced by Ethiopian Jews. This version of Judaism differs substantially from Rabbinic, Karaite, and Samaritan Judaisms, Ethiopian Jews having diverged from their coreligionists earlier. Sacred scriptures (the Orit) are written in Ge'ez, not Hebrew, and dietary laws are based strictly on the text of the Orit, without explication from ancillary commentaries. Holidays also differ, with some Rabbinic holidays not observed in Ethiopian Jewish communities, and some additional holidays, like Sigd.

Noahide (B'nei Noah movement) 

Noahidism is a Jewish religious movement based on the Seven Laws of Noah and their traditional interpretations within Rabbinic Judaism. According to the halakha, non-Jews (gentiles) are not obligated to convert to Judaism, but they are required to observe the Seven Laws of Noah to be assured of a place in the World to Come (Olam Ha-Ba), the final reward of the righteous. The divinely ordained penalty for violating any of the Laws of Noah is discussed in the Talmud, but in practical terms it is subject to the working legal system which is established by the society at large. Those who subscribe to the observance of the Noahic Covenant are referred to as B'nei Noach (Hebrew: בני נח, "Children of Noah") or Noahides (/ˈnoʊ.ə.haɪdɪs/). Supporting organizations have been established around the world over the past decades by both Noahides and Orthodox Jews.

Historically, the Hebrew term B'nei Noach has applied to all non-Jews as descendants of Noah. However, nowadays it's primarily used to refer specifically to those non-Jews who observe the Seven Laws of Noah.

Jewish observances

Jewish ethics

Jewish ethics may be guided by halakhic traditions, by other moral principles, or by central Jewish virtues. Jewish ethical practice is typically understood to be marked by values such as justice, truth, peace, loving-kindness (chesed), compassion, humility, and self-respect. Specific Jewish ethical practices include practices of charity (tzedakah) and refraining from negative speech (lashon hara). Proper ethical practices regarding sexuality and many other issues are subjects of dispute among Jews.

Prayers

Traditionally, Jews recite prayers three times daily, Shacharit, Mincha, and Ma'ariv with a fourth prayer, Mussaf added on Shabbat and holidays. At the heart of each service is the Amidah or Shemoneh Esrei. Another key prayer in many services is the declaration of faith, the Shema Yisrael (or Shema). The Shema is the recitation of a verse from the Torah (Deuteronomy 6:4): Shema Yisrael Adonai Eloheinu Adonai Echad—"Hear, O Israel! The Lord is our God! The Lord is One!"

Most of the prayers in a traditional Jewish service can be recited in solitary prayer, although communal prayer is preferred. Communal prayer requires a quorum of ten adult Jews, called a minyan. In nearly all Orthodox and a few Conservative circles, only male Jews are counted toward a minyan; most Conservative Jews and members of other Jewish denominations count female Jews as well.

In addition to prayer services, observant traditional Jews recite prayers and benedictions throughout the day when performing various acts. Prayers are recited upon waking up in the morning, before eating or drinking different foods, after eating a meal, and so on.

The approach to prayer varies among the Jewish denominations. Differences can include the texts of prayers, the frequency of prayer, the number of prayers recited at various religious events, the use of musical instruments and choral music, and whether prayers are recited in the traditional liturgical languages or the vernacular. In general, Orthodox and Conservative congregations adhere most closely to tradition, and Reform and Reconstructionist synagogues are more likely to incorporate translations and contemporary writings in their services. Also, in most Conservative synagogues, and all Reform and Reconstructionist congregations, women participate in prayer services on an equal basis with men, including roles traditionally filled only by men, such as reading from the Torah. In addition, many Reform temples use musical accompaniment such as organs and mixed choirs.

Religious clothing

A kippah (Hebrew: כִּפָּה, plural kippot; Yiddish: יאַרמלקע, yarmulke) is a slightly rounded brimless skullcap worn by many Jews while praying, eating, reciting blessings, or studying Jewish religious texts, and at all times by some Jewish men. In Orthodox communities, only men wear kippot; in non-Orthodox communities, some women also wear kippot. Kippot range in size from a small round beanie that covers only the back of the head to a large, snug cap that covers the whole crown.

Tzitzit (Hebrew: צִיציִת) (Ashkenazi pronunciation: tzitzis) are special knotted "fringes" or "tassels" found on the four corners of the tallit (Hebrew: טַלִּית) (Ashkenazi pronunciation: tallis), or prayer shawl. The tallit is worn by Jewish men and some Jewish women during the prayer service. Customs vary regarding when a Jew begins wearing a tallit. In the Sephardi community, boys wear a tallit from bar mitzvah age. In some Ashkenazi communities, it is customary to wear one only after marriage. A tallit katan (small tallit) is a fringed garment worn under the clothing throughout the day. In some Orthodox circles, the fringes are allowed to hang freely outside the clothing.

Tefillin (Hebrew: תְפִלִּין), known in English as phylacteries (from the Greek word φυλακτήριον, meaning safeguard or amulet), are two square leather boxes containing biblical verses, attached to the forehead and wound around the left arm by leather straps. They are worn during weekday morning prayer by observant Jewish men and some Jewish women.

A kittel (Yiddish: קיטל), a white knee-length overgarment, is worn by prayer leaders and some observant traditional Jews on the High Holidays. It is traditional for the head of the household to wear a kittel at the Passover seder in some communities, and some grooms wear one under the wedding canopy. Jewish males are buried in a tallit and sometimes also a kittel which are part of the tachrichim (burial garments).

Jewish holidays

Jewish holidays are special days in the Jewish calendar, which celebrate moments in Jewish history, as well as central themes in the relationship between God and the world, such as creation, revelation, and redemption.

Shabbat

Shabbat, the weekly day of rest lasting from shortly before sundown on Friday night to nightfall on Saturday night, commemorates God's day of rest after six days of creation. It plays a pivotal role in Jewish practice and is governed by a large corpus of religious law. At sundown on Friday, the woman of the house welcomes the Shabbat by lighting two or more candles and reciting a blessing. The evening meal begins with the Kiddush, a blessing recited aloud over a cup of wine, and the Mohtzi, a blessing recited over the bread. It is customary to have challah, two braided loaves of bread, on the table. During Shabbat, Jews are forbidden to engage in any activity that falls under 39 categories of melakhah, translated literally as "work". In fact the activities banned on the Sabbath are not "work" in the usual sense: They include such actions as lighting a fire, writing, using money and carrying in the public domain. The prohibition of lighting a fire has been extended in the modern era to driving a car, which involves burning fuel and using electricity.

Three pilgrimage festivals

Jewish holy days (chaggim), celebrate landmark events in Jewish history, such as the Exodus from Egypt and the giving of the Torah, and sometimes mark the change of seasons and transitions in the agricultural cycle. The three major festivals, Sukkot, Passover and Shavuot, are called "regalim" (derived from the Hebrew word "regel", or foot). On the three regalim, it was customary for the Israelites to make pilgrimages to Jerusalem to offer sacrifices in the Temple.
Passover (Pesach) is a week-long holiday beginning on the evening of the 14th day of Nisan (the first month in the Hebrew calendar), that commemorates the Exodus from Egypt. Outside Israel, Passover is celebrated for eight days. In ancient times, it coincided with the barley harvest. It is the only holiday that centers on home-service, the Seder. Leavened products (chametz) are removed from the house prior to the holiday and are not consumed throughout the week. Homes are thoroughly cleaned to ensure no bread or bread by-products remain, and a symbolic burning of the last vestiges of chametz is conducted on the morning of the Seder. Matzo is eaten instead of bread.
 Shavuot ("Pentecost" or "Feast of Weeks") celebrates the revelation of the Torah to the Israelites on Mount Sinai. Also known as the Festival of Bikurim, or first fruits, it coincided in biblical times with the wheat harvest. Shavuot customs include all-night study marathons known as Tikkun Leil Shavuot, eating dairy foods (cheesecake and blintzes are special favorites), reading the Book of Ruth, decorating homes and synagogues with greenery, and wearing white clothing, symbolizing purity.
Sukkot ("Tabernacles" or "The Festival of Booths") commemorates the Israelites' forty years of wandering through the desert on their way to the Promised Land. It is celebrated through the construction of temporary booths called sukkot (sing. sukkah) that represent the temporary shelters of the Israelites during their wandering. It coincides with the fruit harvest and marks the end of the agricultural cycle. Jews around the world eat in sukkot for seven days and nights. Sukkot concludes with Shemini Atzeret, where Jews begin to pray for rain and Simchat Torah, "Rejoicing of the Torah", a holiday which marks reaching the end of the Torah reading cycle and beginning all over again. The occasion is celebrated with singing and dancing with the Torah scrolls. Shemini Atzeret and Simchat Torah are technically considered to be a separate holiday and not a part of Sukkot.

High Holy Days

The High Holidays (Yamim Noraim or "Days of Awe") revolve around judgment and forgiveness.
 Rosh Hashanah, (also Yom Ha-Zikkaron or "Day of Remembrance", and Yom Teruah, or "Day of the Sounding of the Shofar"). Rosh Hashanah is the Jewish New Year (literally, "head of the year"), although it falls on the first day of the seventh month of the Hebrew calendar, Tishri. Rosh Hashanah marks the beginning of the 10-day period of atonement leading up to Yom Kippur, during which Jews are commanded to search their souls and make amends for sins committed, intentionally or not, throughout the year. Holiday customs include blowing the shofar, or ram's horn, in the synagogue, eating apples and honey, and saying blessings over a variety of symbolic foods, such as pomegranates.
 Yom Kippur, ("Day of Atonement") is the holiest day of the Jewish year. It is a day of communal fasting and praying for forgiveness for one's sins. Observant Jews spend the entire day in the synagogue, sometimes with a short break in the afternoon, reciting prayers from a special holiday prayerbook called a "Machzor". Many non-religious Jews make a point of attending synagogue services and fasting on Yom Kippur. On the eve of Yom Kippur, before candles are lit, a prefast meal, the "seuda mafseket", is eaten. Synagogue services on the eve of Yom Kippur begin with the Kol Nidre prayer. It is customary to wear white on Yom Kippur, especially for Kol Nidre, and leather shoes are not worn. The following day, prayers are held from morning to evening. The final prayer service, called "Ne'ilah", ends with a long blast of the shofar.

Purim

Purim (Hebrew:  Pûrîm "lots") is a joyous Jewish holiday that commemorates the deliverance of the Persian Jews from the plot of the evil Haman, who sought to exterminate them, as recorded in the biblical Book of Esther. It is characterized by public recitation of the Book of Esther, mutual gifts of food and drink, charity to the poor, and a celebratory meal (Esther 9:22). Other customs include drinking wine, eating special pastries called hamantashen, dressing up in masks and costumes, and organizing carnivals and parties.

Purim has celebrated annually on the 14th of the Hebrew month of Adar, which occurs in February or March of the Gregorian calendar.

Hanukkah

Hanukkah ("dedication") also known as the Festival of Lights, is an eight-day Jewish holiday that starts on the 25th day of Kislev (Hebrew calendar). The festival is observed in Jewish homes by the kindling of lights on each of the festival's eight nights, one on the first night, two on the second night and so on.

The holiday was called Hanukkah (meaning "dedication") because it marks the re-dedication of the Temple after its desecration by Antiochus IV Epiphanes. Spiritually, Hanukkah commemorates the "Miracle of the Oil". According to the Talmud, at the re-dedication of the Temple in Jerusalem following the victory of the Maccabees over the Seleucid Empire, there was only enough consecrated oil to fuel the eternal flame in the Temple for one day. Miraculously, the oil burned for eight days—which was the length of time it took to press, prepare and consecrate new oil.

Hanukkah is not mentioned in the Bible and was never considered a major holiday in Judaism, but it has become much more visible and widely celebrated in modern times, mainly because it falls around the same time as Christmas and has national Jewish overtones that have been emphasized since the establishment of the State of Israel.

Fast days

There are three more minor Jewish fast days that commemorate various stages of the destruction of the Temples. They are the 17th Tamuz, the 10th of Tevet and Tzom Gedaliah (the 3rd of Tishrei).

Israeli holidays

The modern holidays of Yom Ha-shoah (Holocaust Remembrance Day), Yom Hazikaron (Israeli Memorial Day) and Yom Ha'atzmaut (Israeli Independence Day) commemorate the horrors of the Holocaust, the fallen soldiers of Israel and victims of terrorism, and Israeli independence, respectively.

There are some who prefer to commemorate those who were killed in the Holocaust on the 10th of Tevet.

Torah readings

The core of festival and Shabbat prayer services is the public reading of the Torah, along with connected readings from the other books of the Tanakh, called Haftarah. Over the course of a year, the whole Torah is read, with the cycle starting over in the autumn, on Simchat Torah.

Synagogues and religious buildings

Synagogues are Jewish houses of prayer and study. They usually contain separate rooms for prayer (the main sanctuary), smaller rooms for study, and often an area for community or educational use. There is no set blueprint for synagogues and the architectural shapes and interior designs of synagogues vary greatly. The Reform movement mostly refer to their synagogues as temples. Some traditional features of a synagogue are:

 The ark (called aron ha-kodesh by Ashkenazim and hekhal by Sephardim) where the Torah scrolls are kept (the ark is often closed with an ornate curtain (parochet) outside or inside the ark doors);
 The elevated reader's platform (called bimah by Ashkenazim and tebah by Sephardim), where the Torah is read (and services are conducted in Sephardi synagogues);
 The eternal light (ner tamid), a continually lit lamp or lantern used as a reminder of the constantly lit menorah of the Temple in Jerusalem
 The pulpit, or amud, a lectern facing the Ark where the hazzan or prayer leader stands while praying.

In addition to synagogues, other buildings of significance in Judaism include yeshivas, or institutions of Jewish learning, and mikvahs, which are ritual baths.

Dietary laws: kashrut

The Jewish dietary laws are known as kashrut. Food prepared in accordance with them is termed kosher, and food that is not kosher is also known as treifah or treif. People who observe these laws are colloquially said to be "keeping kosher".

Many of the laws apply to animal-based foods. For example, in order to be considered kosher, mammals must have split hooves and chew their cud. The pig is arguably the most well-known example of a non-kosher animal. Although it has split hooves, it does not chew its cud. For seafood to be kosher, the animal must have fins and scales. Certain types of seafood, such as shellfish, crustaceans, and eels, are therefore considered non-kosher. Concerning birds, a list of non-kosher species is given in the Torah. The exact translations of many of the species have not survived, and some non-kosher birds' identities are no longer certain. However, traditions exist about the kashrut status of a few birds. For example, both chickens and turkeys are permitted in most communities. Other types of animals, such as amphibians, reptiles, and most insects, are prohibited altogether.

In addition to the requirement that the species be considered kosher, meat and poultry (but not fish) must come from a healthy animal slaughtered in a process known as shechitah. Without the proper slaughtering practices even an otherwise kosher animal will be rendered treif. The slaughtering process is intended to be quick and relatively painless to the animal. Forbidden parts of animals include the blood, some fats, and the area in and around the sciatic nerve.

Halakha also forbids the consumption of meat and dairy products together. The waiting period between eating meat and eating dairy varies by the order in which they are consumed and by community, and can extend for up to six hours. Based on the Biblical injunction against cooking a kid in its mother's milk, this rule is mostly derived from the Oral Torah, the Talmud and Rabbinic la. Chicken and other kosher birds are considered the same as meat under the laws of kashrut, but the prohibition is rabbinic, not biblical.

The use of dishes, serving utensils, and ovens may make food treif that would otherwise be kosher. Utensils that have been used to prepare non-kosher food, or dishes that have held meat and are now used for dairy products, render the food treif under certain conditions.

Furthermore, all Orthodox and some Conservative authorities forbid the consumption of processed grape products made by non-Jews, due to ancient pagan practices of using wine in rituals. Some Conservative authorities permit wine and grape juice made without rabbinic supervision.

The Torah does not give specific reasons for most of the laws of kashrut. However, a number of explanations have been offered, including maintaining ritual purity, teaching impulse control, encouraging obedience to God, improving health, reducing cruelty to animals and preserving the distinctness of the Jewish community. The various categories of dietary laws may have developed for different reasons, and some may exist for multiple reasons. For example, people are forbidden from consuming the blood of birds and mammals because, according to the Torah, this is where animal souls are contained. In contrast, the Torah forbids Israelites from eating non-kosher species because "they are unclean". The Kabbalah describes sparks of holiness that are released by the act of eating kosher foods, but are too tightly bound in non-kosher foods to be released by eating.

Survival concerns supersede all the laws of kashrut, as they do for most halakhot.

Laws of ritual purity

The Tanakh describes circumstances in which a person who is tahor or ritually pure may become tamei or ritually impure. Some of these circumstances are contact with human corpses or graves, seminal flux, vaginal flux, menstruation, and contact with people who have become impure from any of these. In Rabbinic Judaism, Kohanim, members of the hereditary caste that served as priests in the time of the Temple, are mostly restricted from entering grave sites and touching dead bodies. During the Temple period, such priests (Kohanim) were required to eat their bread offering (Terumah) in a state of ritual purity, which laws eventually led to more rigid laws being enacted, such as hand-washing which became a requisite of all Jews before consuming ordinary bread.

Family purity

An important subcategory of the ritual purity laws relates to the segregation of menstruating women. These laws are also known as niddah, literally "separation", or family purity. Vital aspects of halakha for traditionally observant Jews, they are not usually followed by Jews in liberal denominations.

Especially in Orthodox Judaism, the Biblical laws are augmented by Rabbinical injunctions. For example, the Torah mandates that a woman in her normal menstrual period must abstain from sexual intercourse for seven days. A woman whose menstruation is prolonged must continue to abstain for seven more days after bleeding has stopped. The Rabbis conflated ordinary niddah with this extended menstrual period, known in the Torah as zavah, and mandated that a woman may not have sexual intercourse with her husband from the time she begins her menstrual flow until seven days after it ends. In addition, Rabbinical law forbids the husband from touching or sharing a bed with his wife during this period. Afterwards, purification can occur in a ritual bath called a mikveh

Traditional Ethiopian Jews keep menstruating women in separate huts and, similar to Karaite practice, do not allow menstruating women into their temples because of a temple's special sanctity. Emigration to Israel and the influence of other Jewish denominations have led to Ethiopian Jews adopting more normative Jewish practices.

Life-cycle events
Life-cycle events, or rites of passage, occur throughout a Jew's life that serves to strengthen Jewish identity and bind him/her to the entire community.
 Brit milah – Welcoming male babies into the covenant through the rite of circumcision on their eighth day of life. The baby boy is also given his Hebrew name in the ceremony. A naming ceremony intended as a parallel ritual for girls, named zeved habat or brit bat, enjoys limited popularity.
 Bar mitzvah and Bat mitzvah – This passage from childhood to adulthood takes place when a female Jew is twelve and a male Jew is thirteen years old among Orthodox and some Conservative congregations. In the Reform movement, both girls and boys have their bat/bar mitzvah at age thirteen. This is often commemorated by having the new adults, male only in the Orthodox tradition, lead the congregation in prayer and publicly read a "portion" of the Torah.
 Marriage – Marriage is an extremely important lifecycle event. A wedding takes place under a chuppah, or wedding canopy, which symbolizes a happy house. At the end of the ceremony, the groom breaks a glass with his foot, symbolizing the continuous mourning for the destruction of the Temple, and the scattering of the Jewish people.

 Death and Mourning – Judaism has a multi-staged mourning practice. The first stage is called the shiva (literally "seven", observed for one week) during which it is traditional to sit at home and be comforted by friends and family, the second is the shloshim (observed for one month) and for those who have lost one of their parents, there is a third stage, avelut yud bet chodesh, which is observed for eleven months.

Community leadership

Classical priesthood

The role of the priesthood in Judaism has significantly diminished since the destruction of the Second Temple in 70 CE when priests attended to the Temple and sacrifices. The priesthood is an inherited position, and although priests no longer have any but ceremonial duties, they are still honored in many Jewish communities. Many Orthodox Jewish communities believe that they will be needed again for a future Third Temple and need to remain in readiness for future duty.
 Kohen (priest) – patrilineal descendant of Aaron, brother of Moses. In the Temple, the kohanim were charged with performing the sacrifices. Today, a Kohen is the first one called up at the reading of the Torah, performs the Priestly Blessing, as well as complying with other unique laws and ceremonies, including the ceremony of redemption of the first-born.
 Levi (Levite) – Patrilineal descendant of Levi the son of Jacob. In the Temple in Jerusalem, the levites sang Psalms, performed construction, maintenance, janitorial, and guard duties, assisted the priests, and sometimes interpreted the law and Temple ritual to the public. Today, a Levite is called up second to the reading of the Torah.

Prayer leaders

From the time of the Mishnah and Talmud to the present, Judaism has required specialists or authorities for the practice of very few rituals or ceremonies. A Jew can fulfill most requirements for prayer by himself. Some activities—reading the Torah and haftarah (a supplementary portion from the Prophets or Writings), the prayer for mourners, the blessings for bridegroom and bride, the complete grace after meals—require a minyan, the presence of ten Jews.

The most common professional clergy in a synagogue are:
 Rabbi of a congregation – Jewish scholar who is charged with answering the legal questions of a congregation. This role requires ordination by the congregation's preferred authority (i.e., from a respected Orthodox rabbi or, if the congregation is Conservative or Reform, from academic seminaries). A congregation does not necessarily require a rabbi. Some congregations have a rabbi but also allow members of the congregation to act as shatz or baal kriyah (see below).
 Hassidic Rebbe – rabbi who is the head of a Hasidic dynasty.
 Hazzan (note: the "h" denotes voiceless pharyngeal fricative) (cantor) – a trained vocalist who acts as shatz. Chosen for a good voice, knowledge of traditional tunes, understanding of the meaning of the prayers and sincerity in reciting them. A congregation does not need to have a dedicated hazzan.

Jewish prayer services do involve two specified roles, which are sometimes, but not always, filled by a rabbi or hazzan in many congregations. In other congregations these roles are filled on an ad-hoc basis by members of the congregation who lead portions of services on a rotating basis:
 Shaliach tzibur or Shatz (leader—literally "agent" or "representative"—of the congregation) leads those assembled in prayer and sometimes prays on behalf of the community. When a shatz recites a prayer on behalf of the congregation, he is not acting as an intermediary but rather as a facilitator. The entire congregation participates in the recital of such prayers by saying amen at their conclusion; it is with this act that the shatz's prayer becomes the prayer of the congregation. Any adult capable of reciting the prayers clearly may act as shatz. In Orthodox congregations and some Conservative congregations, only men can be prayer leaders, but all Progressive communities now allow women to serve in this function.
 The Baal kriyah or baal koreh (master of the reading) reads the weekly Torah portion. The requirements for being the baal kriyah are the same as those for the shatz. These roles are not mutually exclusive. The same person is often qualified to fill more than one role and often does. Often there are several people capable of filling these roles and different services (or parts of services) will be led by each.

Many congregations, especially larger ones, also rely on a:
 Gabbai (sexton) – Calls people up to the Torah, appoints the shatz for each prayer session if there is no standard shatz, and makes certain that the synagogue is kept clean and supplied.

The three preceding positions are usually voluntary and considered an honor. Since the Enlightenment large synagogues have often adopted the practice of hiring rabbis and hazzans to act as shatz and baal kriyah, and this is still typically the case in many Conservative and Reform congregations. However, in most Orthodox synagogues these positions are filled by laypeople on a rotating or ad-hoc basis. Although most congregations hire one or more Rabbis, the use of a professional hazzan is generally declining in American congregations, and the use of professionals for other offices is rarer still.

Specialized religious roles
 Dayan (judge) – An ordained rabbi with special legal training who belongs to a beth din (rabbinical court). In Israel, religious courts handle marriage and divorce cases, conversion and financial disputes in the Jewish community.
 Mohel (circumciser) – An expert in the laws of circumcision who has received training from a previously qualified mohel and performs the brit milah (circumcision).
 Shochet (ritual slaughterer) – In order for meat to be kosher, it must be slaughtered by a shochet who is an expert in the laws of kashrut and has been trained by another shochet.
 Sofer (scribe) – Torah scrolls, tefillin (phylacteries), mezuzot (scrolls put on doorposts), and gittin (bills of divorce) must be written by a sofer who is an expert in Hebrew calligraphy and has undergone rigorous training in the laws of writing sacred texts.
 Rosh yeshiva – A Torah scholar who runs a yeshiva.
 Mashgiach/Mashgicha of a yeshiva – Depending on which yeshiva, might either be the person responsible for ensuring attendance and proper conduct, or even supervise the emotional and spiritual welfare of the students and give lectures on mussar (Jewish ethics).
 Mashgiach/Mashgicha – Supervises manufacturers of kosher food, importers, caterers and restaurants to ensure that the food is kosher. Must be an expert in the laws of kashrut and trained by a rabbi, if not a rabbi himself or herself.

Historical Jewish groupings (to 1700)
Around the 1st century CE, there were several small Jewish sects: the Pharisees, Sadducees, Zealots, Essenes, and Christians. After the destruction of the Second Temple in 70 CE, these sects vanished. Christianity survived, but by breaking with Judaism and becoming a separate religion; the Pharisees survived but in the form of Rabbinic Judaism (today, known simply as "Judaism"). The Sadducees rejected the divine inspiration of the Prophets and the Writings, relying only on the Torah as divinely inspired. Consequently, a number of other core tenets of the Pharisees' belief system (which became the basis for modern Judaism), were also dismissed by the Sadducees. (The Samaritans practiced a similar religion, which is traditionally considered separate from Judaism.)

Like the Sadducees who relied only on the Torah, some Jews in the 8th and 9th centuries rejected the authority and divine inspiration of the oral law as recorded in the Mishnah (and developed by later rabbis in the two Talmuds), relying instead only upon the Tanakh. These included the Isunians, the Yudganites, the Malikites, and others. They soon developed oral traditions of their own, which differed from the rabbinic traditions, and eventually formed the Karaite sect. Karaites exist in small numbers today, mostly living in Israel. Rabbinical and Karaite Jews each hold that the others are Jews, but that the other faith is erroneous.

Over a long time, Jews formed distinct ethnic groups in several different geographic areas—amongst others, the Ashkenazi Jews (of central and Eastern Europe), the Sephardi Jews (of Spain, Portugal, and North Africa), the Beta Israel of Ethiopia, the Yemenite Jews from the southern tip of the Arabian Peninsula and the Malabari and Cochin Jews from Kerala . Many of these groups have developed differences in their prayers, traditions and accepted canons; however, these distinctions are mainly the result of their being formed at some cultural distance from normative (rabbinic) Judaism, rather than based on any doctrinal dispute.

Persecutions

Antisemitism arose during the Middle Ages, in the form of persecutions, pogroms, forced conversions, expulsions, social restrictions and ghettoization.

This was different in quality from the repressions of Jews which had occurred in ancient times. Ancient repressions were politically motivated and Jews were treated the same as members of other ethnic groups. With the rise of the Churches, the main motive for attacks on Jews changed from politics to religion and the religious motive for such attacks was specifically derived from Christian views about Jews and Judaism. During the Middle Ages, Jewish people who lived under Muslim rule generally experienced tolerance and integration, but there were occasional outbreaks of violence like Almohad's persecutions.

Hasidism

Hasidic Judaism was founded by Yisroel ben Eliezer (1700–1760), also known as the Ba'al Shem Tov (or Besht). It originated in a time of persecution of the Jewish people when European Jews had turned inward to Talmud study; many felt that most expressions of Jewish life had become too "academic", and that they no longer had any emphasis on spirituality or joy. Its adherents favored small and informal gatherings called Shtiebel, which, in contrast to a traditional synagogue, could be used both as a place of worship and for celebrations involving dancing, eating, and socializing. Ba'al Shem Tov's disciples attracted many followers; they themselves established numerous Hasidic sects across Europe. Unlike other religions, which typically expanded through word of mouth or by use of print, Hasidism spread largely owing to Tzadiks, who used their influence to encourage others to follow the movement. Hasidism appealed to many Europeans because it was easy to learn, did not require full immediate commitment, and presented a compelling spectacle. Hasidic Judaism eventually became the way of life for many Jews in Eastern Europe. Waves of Jewish immigration in the 1880s carried it to the United States. The movement itself claims to be nothing new, but a refreshment of original Judaism. As some have put it: "they merely re-emphasized that which the generations had lost". Nevertheless, early on there was a serious schism between Hasidic and non-Hasidic Jews. European Jews who rejected the Hasidic movement were dubbed by the Hasidim as Misnagdim, (lit. "opponents"). Some of the reasons for the rejection of Hasidic Judaism were the exuberance of Hasidic worship, its deviation from tradition in ascribing infallibility and miracles to their leaders, and the concern that it might become a messianic sect. Over time differences between the Hasidim and their opponents have slowly diminished and both groups are now considered part of Haredi Judaism.

The Enlightenment and new religious movements

In the late 18th century CE, Europe was swept by a group of intellectual, social and political movements known as the Enlightenment. The Enlightenment led to reductions in the European laws that prohibited Jews to interact with the wider secular world, thus allowing Jews access to secular education and experience. A parallel Jewish movement, Haskalah or the "Jewish Enlightenment", began, especially in Central Europe and Western Europe, in response to both the Enlightenment and these new freedoms. It placed an emphasis on integration with secular society and a pursuit of non-religious knowledge through reason. With the promise of political emancipation, many Jews saw no reason to continue to observe halakha and increasing numbers of Jews assimilated into Christian Europe. Modern religious movements of Judaism all formed in reaction to this trend.

In Central Europe, followed by Great Britain and the United States, Reform (or Liberal) Judaism developed, relaxing legal obligations (especially those that limited Jewish relations with non-Jews), emulating Protestant decorum in prayer, and emphasizing the ethical values of Judaism's Prophetic tradition. Modern Orthodox Judaism developed in reaction to Reform Judaism, by leaders who argued that Jews could participate in public life as citizens equal to Christians while maintaining the observance of halakha. Meanwhile, in the United States, wealthy Reform Jews helped European scholars, who were Orthodox in practice but critical (and skeptical) in their study of the Bible and Talmud, to establish a seminary to train rabbis for immigrants from Eastern Europe. These left-wing Orthodox rabbis were joined by right-wing Reform rabbis who felt that halakha should not be entirely abandoned, to form the Conservative movement. Orthodox Jews who opposed the Haskalah formed Haredi Orthodox Judaism. After massive movements of Jews following The Holocaust and the creation of the state of Israel, these movements have competed for followers from among traditional Jews in or from other countries.

Spectrum of observance

Jewish religious practice varies widely through all levels of observance. According to the 2001 edition of the National Jewish Population Survey, in the United States' Jewish community—the world's second largest—4.3 million Jews out of 5.1 million had some sort of connection to the religion. Of that population of connected Jews, 80% participated in some sort of Jewish religious observance, but only 48% belonged to a congregation, and fewer than 16% attend regularly.

Judaism and other religions

Christianity and Judaism

Christianity was originally a sect of Second Temple Judaism, but the two religions diverged in the first century. The differences between Christianity and Judaism originally centered on whether Jesus was the Jewish Messiah but eventually became irreconcilable. Major differences between the two faiths include the nature of the Messiah, of atonement and sin, the status of God's commandments to Israel, and perhaps most significantly of the nature of God himself. Due to these differences, Judaism traditionally regards Christianity as Shituf or worship of the God of Israel which is not monotheistic. Christianity has traditionally regarded Judaism as obsolete with the invention of Christianity and Jews as a people replaced by the Church, though a Christian belief in dual-covenant theology emerged as a phenomenon following Christian reflection on how their theology influenced the Nazi Holocaust.

Since the time of the Middle Ages, the Catholic Church upheld the Constitutio pro Judæis (Formal Statement on the Jews), which stated 

Until their emancipation in the late 18th and the 19th century, Jews in Christian lands were subject to humiliating legal restrictions and limitations. They included provisions requiring Jews to wear specific and identifying clothing such as the Jewish hat and the yellow badge, restricting Jews to certain cities and towns or in certain parts of towns (ghettos), and forbidding Jews to enter certain trades (for example selling new clothes in medieval Sweden). Disabilities also included special taxes levied on Jews, exclusion from public life, restraints on the performance of religious ceremonies, and linguistic censorship. Some countries went even further and completely expelled Jews, for example, England in 1290 (Jews were readmitted in 1655) and Spain in 1492 (readmitted in 1868). The first Jewish settlers in North America arrived in the Dutch colony of New Amsterdam in 1654; they were forbidden to hold public office, open a retail shop, or establish a synagogue. When the colony was seized by the British in 1664 Jewish rights remained unchanged, but by 1671 Asser Levy was the first Jew to serve on a jury in North America. In 1791, Revolutionary France was the first country to abolish disabilities altogether, followed by Prussia in 1848. Emancipation of the Jews in the United Kingdom was achieved in 1858 after an almost 30-year struggle championed by Isaac Lyon Goldsmid with the ability of Jews to sit in parliament with the passing of the Jews Relief Act 1858. The newly created German Empire in 1871 abolished Jewish disabilities in Germany, which were reinstated in the Nuremberg Laws in 1935.

Jewish life in Christian lands was marked by frequent blood libels, expulsions, forced conversions and massacres. Religious prejudice was an underlying source against Jews in Europe. Christian rhetoric and antipathy towards Jews developed in the early years of Christianity and was reinforced by ever increasing anti-Jewish measures over the ensuing centuries. The action taken by Christians against Jews included acts of violence, and murder culminating in the Holocaust. These attitudes were reinforced by Christian preaching, in art and popular teaching for two millennia which expressed contempt for Jews, as well as statutes which were designed to humiliate and stigmatise Jews. The Nazi Party was known for its persecution of Christian Churches; many of them, such as the Protestant Confessing Church and the Catholic Church, as well as Quakers and Jehovah's Witnesses, aided and rescued Jews who were being targeted by the antireligious régime.

The attitude of Christians and Christian Churches toward the Jewish people and Judaism have changed in a mostly positive direction since World War II. Pope John Paul II and the Catholic Church have "upheld the Church's acceptance of the continuing and permanent election of the Jewish people" as well as a reaffirmation of the covenant between God and the Jews. In December 2015, the Vatican released a 10,000-word document that, among other things, stated that Catholics should work with Jews to fight antisemitism.

Islam and Judaism

Both Judaism and Islam track their origins from the patriarch Abraham, and they are therefore considered Abrahamic religions. In both Jewish and Muslim tradition, the Jewish and Arab peoples are descended from the two sons of Abraham—Isaac and Ishmael, respectively. While both religions are monotheistic and share many commonalities, they differ based on the fact that Jews do not consider Jesus or Muhammad to be prophets. The religions' adherents have interacted with each other since the 7th century when Islam originated and spread in the Arabian peninsula. Indeed, the years 712 to 1066 CE under the Ummayad and the Abbasid rulers have been called the Golden age of Jewish culture in Spain. Non-Muslim monotheists living in these countries, including Jews, were known as dhimmis. Dhimmis were allowed to practice their own religions and administer their own internal affairs, but they were subject to certain restrictions that were not imposed on Muslims. For example, they had to pay the jizya, a per capita tax imposed on free adult non-Muslim males, and they were also forbidden to bear arms or testify in court cases involving Muslims. Many of the laws regarding dhimmis were highly symbolic. For example, dhimmis in some countries were required to wear distinctive clothing, a practice not found in either the Qur'an or the hadiths but invented in early medieval Baghdad and inconsistently enforced. Jews in Muslim countries were not entirely free from persecution—for example, many were killed, exiled or forcibly converted in the 12th century, in Persia, and by the rulers of the Almohad dynasty in North Africa and Al-Andalus, as well as by the Zaydi imams of Yemen in the 17th century (see: Mawza Exile). At times, Jews were also restricted in their choice of residence—in Morocco, for example, Jews were confined to walled quarters (mellahs) beginning in the 15th century and increasingly since the early 19th century.

In the mid-20th century, Jews were expelled from nearly all of the Arab countries. Most have chosen to live in Israel. Today, antisemitic themes including Holocaust denial have become commonplace in the propaganda of Islamic movements such as Hizbullah and Hamas, in the pronouncements of various agencies of the Islamic Republic of Iran, and even in the newspapers and other publications of Refah Partisi.

Syncretic movements incorporating Judaism
There are some movements in other religions that include elements of Judaism. Among Christianity these are a number of denominations of ancient and contemporary Judaizers. The most well-known of these is Messianic Judaism, a religious movement, which arose in the 1960s,-In this, elements of the messianic traditions in Judaism, are incorporated in, and melded with the tenets of Christianity. The movement generally states that Jesus is the Jewish Messiah, that he is one of the Three Divine Persons, and that salvation is only achieved through acceptance of Jesus as one's savior. Some members of Messianic Judaism argue that it is a sect of Judaism. Jewish organizations of every denomination reject this, stating that Messianic Judaism is a Christian sect, because it teaches creeds which are identical to those of Pauline Christianity. Another religious movement is the Black Hebrew Israelite group, which not to be confused with less syncretic Black Judaism (a constellation of movements which, depending on their adherence to normative Jewish tradition, receive varying degrees of recognition by the broader Jewish community).

Other examples of syncretism include Semitic neopaganism, a loosely organized sect which incorporates pagan or Wiccan beliefs with some Jewish religious practices; Jewish Buddhists, another loosely organized group that incorporates elements of Asian spirituality in their faith; and some Renewal Jews who borrow freely and openly from Buddhism, Sufism, Native American religions, and other faiths.

The Kabbalah Centre, which employs teachers from multiple religions, is a New Age movement that claims to popularize the kabbalah, part of the Jewish esoteric tradition.

Criticism

See also

 List of 21st-century religious leaders#Judaism
 List of religious organizations#Jewish organizations
 Judaism by country
 Outline of Judaism

Footnotes

Bibliography 
 Avery-Peck, Alan; Neusner, Jacob (eds.), The Blackwell reader in Judaism (Blackwell, 2001).
 Avery-Peck, Alan; Neusner, Jacob (eds.), The Blackwell Companion to Judaism (Blackwell, 2003).
 Boyarin, Daniel (1994). A Radical Jew: Paul and the Politics of Identity. Berkeley: University of California Press.
 
 Cohn-Sherbok, Dan, Judaism: history, belief, and practice (Routledge, 2003).
 Day, John (2000). Yahweh and the Gods and Goddesses of Canaan. Chippenham: Sheffield Academic Press.
 Dever, William G. (2005). Did God Have a Wife?. Grand Rapids: Wm. B. Eerdmans Publishing Co..
 Dosick, Wayne, Living Judaism: The Complete Guide to Jewish Belief, Tradition and Practice.
 
 Finkelstein, Israel (1996). "Ethnicity and Origin of the Iron I Settlers in the Highlands of Canaan: Can the Real Israel Please Stand Up?" The Biblical Archaeologist, 59(4).
 Gillman, Neil, Conservative Judaism: The New Century, Behrman House.
 Gurock, Jeffrey S. (1996). American Jewish Orthodoxy in Historical Perspective. KTAV.
 Guttmann, Julius (1964). Trans. by David Silverman, Philosophies of Judaism. JPS.
 Holtz, Barry W. (ed.), Back to the Sources: Reading the Classic Jewish Texts. Summit Books.
 
 
 Johnson, Paul (1988). A History of the Jews. HarperCollins.
 
 Lewis, Bernard (1984). The Jews of Islam. Princeton: Princeton University Press. .
 Lewis, Bernard (1999). Semites and Anti-Semites: An Inquiry into Conflict and Prejudice. W. W. Norton & Co. .
 Mayer, Egon, Barry Kosmin and Ariela Keysar, "The American Jewish Identity Survey", a subset of The American Religious Identity Survey, City University of New York Graduate Center. An article on this survey is printed in The New York Jewish Week, 2 November 2001.
 
 
 
 Raphael, Marc Lee (2003). Judaism in America. Columbia University Press.
 
 
 Walsh, J.P.M. (1987). The Mighty from Their Thrones. Eugene: Wipf and Stock Publishers.
 Weber, Max (1967). Ancient Judaism, Free Press, .
 Wertheime, Jack (1997). A People Divided: Judaism in Contemporary America. Brandeis University Press.
 

Jews in Islamic countries
 Khanbaghi, A. (2006). The Fire, the Star and the Cross: Minority Religions in Medieval and Early Modern Iran. IB Tauris.
 Stillman, Norman (1979). The Jews of Arab Lands: A History and Source Book. Philadelphia: Jewish Publication Society of America. .
 Simon, Reeva; Laskier, Michael; Reguer, Sara (eds.) (2002). The Jews of the Middle East and North Africa In Modern Times, Columbia University Press.

Further reading 
 Encyclopedias

External links

General
 
 Online version of The Jewish Encyclopedia (1901–1906)
 About Judaism by Dotdash (formerly About.com)
 Shamash's Judaism and Jewish Resources

Orthodox/Haredi
 Orthodox Judaism – The Orthodox Union
 Rohr Jewish Learning Institute
 The Various Types of Orthodox Judaism
 Aish HaTorah
 Ohr Somayach

Traditional/Conservadox
 Union for Traditional Judaism

Conservative
 The United Synagogue of Conservative Judaism
 Masorti (Conservative) Movement in Israel
 United Synagogue Youth

Reform/Progressive
 The Union for Reform Judaism (USA)
 Reform Judaism (UK)
 Liberal Judaism (UK)
 World Union for Progressive Judaism (Israel)

Reconstructionist
 Jewish Reconstructionist Federation

Renewal
 ALEPH: Alliance for Jewish Renewal
 OHALAH Association of Rabbis for Jewish Renewal

Humanistic
 Society for Humanistic Judaism

Karaite
 World Movement for Karaite Judaism

Jewish religious literature and texts
 Complete Tanakh (in Hebrew, with vowels).
 Parallel Hebrew-English Tanakh
 English Tanakh from the 1917 Jewish Publication Society version.
 Torah.org. (also known as Project Genesis) Contains Torah commentaries and studies of Tanakh, along with Jewish ethics, philosophy, holidays and other classes.
 The complete formatted Talmud online. Audio files of lectures for each page from an Orthodox viewpoint are provided in French, English, Yiddish and Hebrew. Reload the page for an image of a page of the Talmud.
See also Torah database for links to more Judaism e-texts.

Wikimedia Torah study projects

Text study projects at Wikisource. In many instances, the Hebrew versions of these projects are more fully developed than the English.
 Mikraot Gedolot (Rabbinic Bible) in Hebrew (sample) and English (sample).
 Cantillation at the "Vayavinu Bamikra" Project in Hebrew (lists nearly 200 recordings) and English.
 Mishnah in Hebrew (sample) and English (sample).
 Shulchan Aruch in Hebrew and English (Hebrew text with English translation).

 
 
Abrahamic religions
Monotheistic religions
Ethnic religion
Religion in ancient Israel and Judah
Moses
Abraham